The 1946–47 season in Swedish football, starting August 1946 and ending July 1947:

Honours

Official titles

Competitions

Promotions, relegations and qualifications

Promotions

League transfers

Relegations

Domestic results

Allsvenskan 1946–47

Allsvenskan promotion play-off 1946–47

Division 2 Norra 1946–47

Division 2 Östra 1946–47

Division 2 Västra 1946–47

Division 2 Södra 1946–47

Norrländska Mästerskapet 1947 
Final

Svenska Cupen 1946 
Final

National team results 

 Sweden: 

 Sweden: 

 Sweden: 

 Sweden: 

 Sweden: 

 Sweden:

National team players in season 1946/47

Notes

References 
Print

Online

 
Seasons in Swedish football